Jet lag is a physiological condition that results from alterations to the body's circadian rhythms caused by rapid long-distance trans-meridian (east–west or west–east) travel. For example, someone flying from New York to London, i.e. from west to east, feels as if the time were five hours earlier than local time, and someone travelling from London to New York, i.e. from east to west, feels as if the time were five hours later than local time. The phase shift when traveling from east to west is referred to as phase-delay of the circadian circle, whereas going west to east is phase-advance of the circadian circle. Most travelers find that it is harder to timezone adjust when traveling to the east. Jet lag was previously classified as one of the circadian rhythm sleep disorders.

The condition of jet lag may last several days before the traveller is fully adjusted to the new time zone; a recovery period of one day per time zone crossed is a suggested guideline. Jet lag is especially an issue for airline pilots, aircraft crew, and frequent travellers. Airlines have regulations aimed at combating pilot fatigue caused by jet lag.

The term "jet lag" is used because before the arrival of passenger jet aircraft, it was uncommon to travel far and fast enough to cause desynchronosis. Travel by propeller-driven aircraft, by ship, or by train was slower and of more limited distance than jet flights, and thus did not contribute widely to the issue.

Signs and symptoms
The symptoms of jet lag can be quite varied, depending on the amount of time zone alteration, time of day, and individual differences. Sleep disturbance occurs, with poor sleep upon arrival and/or sleep disruptions such as trouble falling asleep (when flying east), early awakening (when flying west), and trouble remaining asleep. Cognitive effects include poorer performance on mental tasks and concentration; dizziness, nausea, insomnia, confusion, anxiety, increased fatigue, headaches, and irritability; and problems with digestion, including indigestion, changes in the frequency of defecation and consistency of faeces, and reduced interest in and enjoyment of food. The symptoms are caused by a circadian rhythm that is out of sync with the daynight cycle of the destination, as well as the possibility of internal desynchronisation. Jet lag has been measured with simple analogue scales, but a study has shown that these are relatively blunt for assessing all the problems associated with jet lag. The Liverpool Jet Lag Questionnaire was developed to measure all the symptoms of jet lag at several times of day, and this dedicated measurement tool has been used to assess jet lag in athletes.

Jet lag may require a change of three time zones or more to occur, though some individuals can be affected by as little as a single time zone or the single-hour shift to or from daylight saving time. Symptoms and consequences of jet lag can be a significant concern for athletes travelling east or west to competitions, as performance is often dependent on a combination of physical and mental characteristics that are affected by jet lag. This is often a common concern at international sporting events like the Olympics and FIFA World Cup. However many athletes arrive at least 2–4 weeks ahead of these events, to help adjust from any jet lag issues.

Travel fatigue
Travel fatigue is general fatigue, disorientation, and headache caused by a disruption in routine, time spent in a cramped space with little chance to move around, a low-oxygen environment, and dehydration caused by dry air and limited food and drink. It does not necessarily involve the shift in circadian rhythms that cause jet lag. Travel fatigue can occur without crossing time zones, and it often disappears after one day accompanied by a night of good quality sleep.

Cause
Jet lag is a chronobiological problem, similar to issues often induced by shift work and the circadian rhythm sleep disorders. When travelling across a number of time zones, the body clock (circadian rhythm) will be out of synchronisation with the destination time, as it experiences daylight and darkness contrary to the rhythms to which it has grown accustomed. The body's natural pattern is upset, as the rhythms that dictate times for eating, sleeping, hormone regulation, body temperature variations, and other functions no longer correspond to the environment, nor to each other in some cases. To the degree that the body cannot immediately realign these rhythms, it is jet lagged.

The speed at which the body adjusts to the new schedule depends on the individual as well as the direction of travel; some people may require several days to adjust to a new time zone, while others experience little disruption.

Crossing the International Date Line does not in itself contribute to jet lag, as the guide for calculating jet lag is the number of time zones crossed, with a maximum possible time difference of plus or minus 12 hours. If the absolute time difference between two locations is greater than 12 hours, one must subtract 24 from or add 24 to that number. For example, the time zone UTC+14 will be at the same time of day as UTC−10, though the former is one day ahead of the latter.

Jet lag is linked only to the trans-meridian (west–east or east–west) distance travelled. A ten-hour flight between Europe and southern Africa does not cause jet lag, as the direction of travel is primarily north–south. A four-hour flight between Miami, Florida and Phoenix, Arizona in the United States may result in jet lag, as the direction of travel is primarily east–west.

Double desynchronisation
There are two separate processes related to biological timing: circadian oscillators and homeostasis. The circadian system is located in the suprachiasmatic nucleus (SCN) in the hypothalamus of the brain. The other process is homeostatic sleep propensity, which is a function of the amount of time elapsed since the last adequate sleep episode.

The human body has a master clock in the SCN and also peripheral oscillators in tissues. The SCN's role is to send signals to peripheral oscillators, which synchronise them for physiological functions. The SCN responds to light information sent from the retina. It is hypothesised that peripheral oscillators respond to internal signals such as hormones, food intake, and "nervous stimuli".

The implication of independent internal clocks may explain some of the symptoms of jet lag. People who travel across several time zones can, within a few days, adapt their sleep–wake cycles with light from the environment. However, their skeletal muscles, liver, lungs, and other organs will adapt at different rates. This internal biological de-synchronisation is exacerbated as the body is not in sync with the environment – a "double desynchronisation", which has implications for health and mood.

Delayed sleep phase disorder
Delayed sleep phase disorder is a medical disorder characterized by delayed sleeping time and a proportionately delayed waking time due to a phase delay in the endogenous biological master clock.  Specific genotypes underlie this disorder.  If allowed to sleep as dictated by their endogenous clock these individuals do not have any ill effects as a result of their phase shifted sleeping time.

Management
Light is the strongest stimulus for realigning a person's sleep–wake light-dark cycles, and the key to quick adaptation is therefore timed light exposure based on the traveler's sleep pattern, chronotype, itinerary.

Light exposure
Timed light exposure can be effective to help people match their circadian rhythms with the expected cycle at their destination; it requires strict adherence to timing. Light therapy is a popular method used by professional athletes to reduce jet lag. Timed correctly, the light may contribute to an advance or delay of the circadian phase to that which will be needed at the destination.

Melatonin administration
In addition to timed light exposure, the right type and dose of melatonin, at the right time, can help the traveler shift faster and sleep better as they are transitioning between time zones  There remain issues regarding the appropriate timing of melatonin use in addition to the legality of the substance in certain countries. For athletes, anti-doping agencies may prohibit or limit its use.

Melatonin can be considered to be a darkness signal, with effects on circadian timing that are the opposite of the effects of exposure to light. Melatonin receptors are situated on the suprachiasmatic nucleus, which is the anatomical site of the circadian clock. The results of a few field studies of melatonin administration, monitoring circadian phase, have provided evidence for a correlation between the reduction of jet lag symptoms and the accelerated realignment of the circadian clock.

Short duration trips
In the case of short duration trips, an easy way to minimize jet lag is to maintain the sleep-wake schedule from home after arriving at the destination, but this strategy is often unpractical in regard to desired social activities or work obligations. Shifting your sleep schedule before departure by 1–2 hours to match the destination time zone may also shorten the duration of jet lag. Symptoms can be reduced even more through a combination of artificial exposure to light and rescheduling, as it has been shown to augment phase-shifting.

Pharmacotherapy
A short hypnotic medication has been effective to reduce insomnia related to jet lag.
In a study, zolpidem improved sleep quality and reduced awakenings for people traveling across five to nine time zones. Potential adverse effects of hypnotic agents, like amnesia and confusion, should be taken into account. Several cases using triazolam to promote sleep during a flight reported dramatic global amnesia.

Mental health implications
Jet lag may affect the mental health of vulnerable individuals. When travelling across time zones, there is a "phase-shift of body temperature, rapid-eye-movement sleep, melatonin production, and other circadian rhythms". A 2002 study found that relapse of major affective and psychotic disorders occurred more frequently when seven or more time zones had been crossed in the past week than when three or fewer had been crossed. Although significant disruptions of circadian rhythms had been documented as affecting individuals with bipolar disorder, an Australian team studied suicide statistics from 1971 to 2001 to determine whether the one-hour shifts involved in daylight saving time had an effect. They found increased incidence of male suicide after the commencement of daylight saving time but not after returning to standard time.

See also

 Delayed sleep phase disorder
 Sleep deprivation

References

External links 

Aviation medicine
Circadian rhythm
Sleep disorders
Time zones